Czarna Grobla  is a settlement in the administrative district of Gmina Gronowo Elbląskie, within Elbląg County, Warmian-Masurian Voivodeship, in northern Poland.

References

Czarna Grobla